Parmotrema betaniae is a species of corticolous lichen in the family Parmeliaceae that is found in Venezuela. It was described as a new species in 1986 by lichenologist Mason Hale. It has also been recorded from Bolivia. It is characterized by the pigmentation of most of its medulla, coloured pale orange or salmon-red to yellow (except for the upper part).

See also
List of Parmotrema species

References

betaniae
Lichen species
Lichens described in 1986
Lichens of Bolivia
Lichens of Venezuela
Taxa named by Mason Hale